Attorney General Doyle may refer to:

Brian Andre Doyle (1911–2004), Attorney General of Fiji
Jim Doyle (born 1945), Attorney General of Wisconsin

See also
General Doyle (disambiguation)